Federico Bricolo (born 13 July 1966) is an Italian politician. He is a Venetist and a member of Liga Veneta-Lega Nord.

Career
He has been member of the Chamber of Deputies from 2001 to 2008 and of the Senate from 2008 to 2013.

From 2005 to 2006 he served as Under-Secretary of State for Infrastructure and Transport in the Berlusconi III government. In the XVI legislature (2008–13) he was chairman of Lega Nord parliamentary group.

References 

1966 births
Living people
People from the Province of Verona
Lega Nord politicians
Venetist politicians
Deputies of Legislature XIV of Italy
Deputies of Legislature XV of Italy
Senators of Legislature XVI of Italy
Politicians of Veneto